Kanji alias Kanchi is a town in Chengam taluk in Tiruvanamalai district, Tamil Nadu, India. Its population in the 2011 census was 5,873.

Economy
Some of the business units and small scale industries in Kanji are rice mills, garment manufacturing, shoe companies and hand-looms.

Landmarks
It has a temple devoted to Lord Murugan as well as the Karaikandeswarar temple.

Education

Schools 
 St. Antony's school
 Good Heart primary school
 Kamalambal primary school
 Government boys hr.sec school
 Government girls hr.sec school
 Government elementary school
 RCM Primary School

College 
 Annai Terasa Nursery Training College
 Vivekanandha Art School

Other 
A craft centre and Shanthi Lumin children's home are supported by foreign charities including the British charity The Kanji Project.

External links
 The Kanji Project
 Praghathi Agencies, Kanji

References

Cities and towns in Tiruvannamalai district